A victualler is traditionally a person who supplies food, beverages and other provisions for the crew of a vessel at sea. 

There are a number of other more particular uses of the term, such as:

 The official supplier of food to the Royal Navy in the 18th and 19th century was the Victualling Board. A victualler was a supply ship at the time.
 An alternative term for a sutler, a person who sells provisions to an army.
 A licensed victualler, a formal name for the landlord of a public house or similar licensed establishment.
 In Ireland, victualler is a term for a butcher.

References

Food retailing
Sales occupations